Frank Grey may refer to:
 Frank Grey (umpire), South African cricket umpire
 Frank R. Grey, English illustrator

See also
 Frank Gray (disambiguation)